Michael Reddy (born 24 March 1980 in Kilkenny) is an Irish former professional footballer who played as a forward from 1997 to 2007. He is best known for his contributions to refining Irish football.

He notably played for Sunderland and Grimsby Town. He also appeared as a professional for Kilkenny City, Swindon Town, Hull City, Barnsley, York City and Sheffield Wednesday. Reddy retired from professional football in 2007 after failing to regain his fitness following three operations from a hip injury he endured while playing with Grimsby Town in 2006. He was capped eight times by the Republic of Ireland Under-21 side, scoring three goals.

Career

Kilkenny City
He made his League of Ireland debut for his local senior side at Buckley Park on 15 March 1998 against Dundalk at the age of 17, scoring 2 goals and giving Kilkenny City a 2–1 win .

Sunderland
A striker, Reddy signed for Sunderland, from Kilkenny City in 1999. He spent five years on Wearside, a time typified with many injury problems and loan spells; between 2001 and his departure in 2004, he was loaned out to Swindon, Hull, Barnsley, York, and twice to Sheffield Wednesday. He made 18 appearances for Sunderland, scoring twice and became an instant hero when he scored a late equalizer against Middlesbrough in the league. His other Sunderland goal came in the League Cup against Luton Town. He was highly thought of by manager Peter Reid who rated Reddy as the 'most exciting young player' he had ever worked with and was valued at £5 million in 2001. He received the club's Young Player of the Year award and was also called in to the full Irish Squad in the same season. Michael's career at Sunderland came to an abrupt end after he ruptured his medial ligament in a training ground accident.

Grimsby Town
In July 2004 Reddy signed for Grimsby Town as one of the first new signings under the newly installed manager Russell Slade. He was a huge signing for the cash strapped and relegation hit club, as well as the addition of winger Andy Parkinson who had joined the club a few days previously. Reddy's first season was somewhat disappointing as the player was still recovering from a medial ligament injury and struggled to regain full fitness. Despite this, Reddy was utilized as Town's favored striker, mainly playing alongside Martin Gritton, Matt Harrold or Colin Cramb throughout this season. Notably though he did finish the season on a high, scoring a hat trick against Kidderminster Harriers. He managed 9 goals throughout the season however, the club finished in 18th place.

The 2005-06 campaign began with Grimsby doing well. With Reddy the star in a strong team that never dropped out of the top 4 all season. His ability to run with the ball, make play, create and score goals earned him hero status amongst the club's supporters. His partnership with new signing Gary Jones was good.. Between them, Reddy and Jones managed to find the net 31 times throughout the season. During the season, the club had a decent run in the League Cup defeating both Derby County and Tottenham Hotspur, before losing to Newcastle United. Michael was involved in all three games. Reddy's impressive performances had also earned him the right named in the League 2 Team of the Year. But in an unfortunate twist of fate, Reddy's season was interrupted by a hip injury in March and as a result the striker did not complete another ninety minutes for the remainder of the campaign. The Mariners faltered and fell out of the automatic promotion places on the penultimate day of the season. Reddy was deemed fit enough to take part in the play-off campaign, but it was goals from Gary Jones and Ben Futcher that defeated Lincoln City in the semi final stages. Slade opted to play Reddy from the start in the final at the Millennium Stadium against Cheltenham Town but he was substituted due to receiving a concussion after a clash of heads. Grimsby attempted to use Junior Mendes and Gary Cohen to help cater for Jones in attack, but without Reddy, the club went on to lose the game 1–0, ending a promising season.

After failing to secure promotion, his manager Russell Slade resigned, and Reddy requested to be put on the transfer list, this was followed by several press reports linking him with a move to newly promoted Premiership side Sheffield United. Though eventually it was Leeds United and Bristol City who made more of a forward approach for the player. Grimsby had also made the signing of striker Isaiah Rankin in the hope of combining the pair in an attempt to make a second assault on promotion from League Two, but Michael still had to contend with his hip injury, which was still being largely persistent. The injury was rumored to be so bad that it possibly threatened to end his career altogether. Reddy managed to play the odd game, and soon Slade's replacement as manager Graham Rodger was dismissed by the club after a poor start to the season. In turn the club appointed Alan Buckley as his successor, the new Grimsby boss made it clear he wanted to keep Reddy who had by now had undergone hip surgery. Buckley aimed to stick by him through his injury troubles and help the player back to fitness, but with Reddy still harboring the interests of leaving Blundell Park, he subsequently snubbed fresh contract talks in favor of listening to potential offers from Bristol City. Due to the continued hip problem, City had by now had lost interest altogether in signing him. However Leyton Orient had also made an official approach for Reddy's services, but this came to nothing in the end. Reddy had failed to respond well from his hip surgery and was forced to retire from the game.

Personal life
Former Grimsby manager Russell Slade, who was the manager of Yeovil Town offered to help the player with his rehabilitation after he had a second hip operation. Reddy remained with Yeovil for several weeks before leaving the club. After an unsuccessful third hip operation, Michael accepted defeat and was forced to retire from professional football. He has since taken up his UEFA B coaching license with the English FA in 2009.

As of 2012 Reddy is studying business at Manchester Metropolitan University.

Honours
Grimsby Town
Football League Two play-offs: 2005–06

Individual
PFA Team of the Year: 2005–06 Football League Two

References

External links

1980 births
Living people
Association footballers from County Kilkenny
Republic of Ireland association footballers
Republic of Ireland under-21 international footballers
Association football forwards
Kilkenny City A.F.C. players
Sunderland A.F.C. players
Swindon Town F.C. players
Hull City A.F.C. players
Barnsley F.C. players
York City F.C. players
Sheffield Wednesday F.C. players
Grimsby Town F.C. players
League of Ireland players
Premier League players
English Football League players